"Bigger than the Universe" is a song by Swedish singer Anders Bagge, released as a single on 26 February 2022. It was performed in Melodifestivalen 2022 and made it to the final on 12 March 2022.

Charts

Weekly charts

Year-end charts

References

2022 songs
2022 singles
Melodifestivalen songs of 2022
Songs written by Anders Bagge
Songs written by Jimmy Jansson
Songs written by Peter Boström
Songs written by Thomas G:son